The following is a list of films produced in the Tamil film industry in India in 1940, in alphabetical order.

1940

References

Films, Tamil
Tamil
1940
1940s Tamil-language films